Prabha Shankar Shukla is the Vice-Chancellor of North-Eastern Hill University North-Eastern Hill University (NEHU) as of 27 July 2021.

Awards and honours
Higher Education Award

References